The Seattle Seawolves are an American professional rugby union team based in Tukwila, Washington. The team was founded in 2017 and competes in Major League Rugby (MLR), the top-level rugby union competition in the United States that began play in 2018. The Seawolves won two MLR championships in 2018 and 2019, and lost in the 2022 final. They play at Starfire Sports, a 4,500-seat stadium in Tukwila that primarily serves soccer teams.

History

The team was founded in 2017 by an investor group headed by Adrian Balfour and Shane Skinner. The Seawolves won the inaugural MLR Grand Final in 2018, and defended the title in the 2019 Major League Rugby Championship. In the final on June 16, 2019, the Seattle Seawolves defeated San Diego Legion 26–23 at Torero Stadium on the campus of the University of San Diego.

Stadium

The Seattle Seawolves play at Starfire Sports Complex in Tukwila. The team offered 1,800 season tickets for their inaugural season, which sold out prior to the first match.

Broadcasts

Home games for 2019 were shown on Root Sports Northwest, an AT&T SportsNet affiliate. Dan Power and Kevin Swiryn were the on-air talent.

Kit history

Sponsorship

Players and personnel

Current squad

The Seattle Seawolves squad for the 2023 Major League Rugby season is:

 Senior 15s internationally capped players are listed in bold.
 MLR teams are allowed to field up to ten overseas players per match.

Head coaches
  Tony Healy (2018) did not take up post due to visa difficulties
 Phil Mack (2018)
  Anton Moolman (2019) did not take up post due to visa difficulties
 Richie Walker (2019)
  Kees Lensing (2020–April 2021)
  Pate Tuilevuka (May–June 2021–)
  Allen Clarke (May 2021–)

Captains
  Riekert Hattingh (2018–present)

Records

Season standings

Notes

Honors
Major League Rugby
Champions: 2018, 2019
Playoff appearances: 2018, 2019, 2022
Western Conference Championship (playoffs): 2022

2018 season

Regular season

Postseason

2019 season

Exhibition

Regular season

Postseason

2020 season

On March 12, 2020, MLR announced the season would go on hiatus immediately for 30 days due to fears surrounding the 2019–2020 coronavirus pandemic. It was cancelled the following week

Regular season

2021 season

Regular season

2022 season

Exhibition

Regular season

Post season

References

External links
 

 
Major League Rugby teams
2017 establishments in Washington (state)
Rugby union teams in Washington (state)
Rugby clubs established in 2017
Sports in Seattle